Yelyzaveta Vasylyga (born October 2, 1998) is a Ukrainian female acrobatic gymnast. Along with partner, Oleksandr Shpyn, she finished 6th in the 2014 Acrobatic Gymnastics World Championships.

References

1998 births
Living people
Ukrainian acrobatic gymnasts
Female acrobatic gymnasts
European Games competitors for Ukraine
Gymnasts at the 2015 European Games